Christos Theodorakis (born 17 September 1996) is a Greek professional footballer who plays as a goalkeeper for Super League 2 club Panachaiki.

Career
On 5 June 2019, he signed a contract extension, until the summer of 2022.

Career statistics

Club

References

External links 

1996 births
Living people
Greek footballers
Greece under-21 international footballers
Greece youth international footballers
Super League Greece players
Kallithea F.C. players
Atromitos F.C. players
Rodos F.C. players
Association football goalkeepers
Footballers from Ioannina